This article refers to the mountain. For information on the national forest, see El Yunque National Forest. For the mountain in Cuba, see El Yunque.

Pico El Yunque or El Yunque Peak (Taíno: Yukiyu) is a mountain that is located fully within the boundaries of the El Yunque National Forest, part of the U.S. Forest Service, which is the only tropical rainforest under the U.S. Forest Service jurisdiction. It is located in the municipality of Río Grande.

Background
It is however the most famous peak due to its curious shape, its natural environment and history, and for its cultural importance to the Taino people. The peak is nearly always covered in thin mist and, due to its high humidity, a quick shower develops during some afternoons. The hike to the top from the Mina Falls is not challenging yet it takes almost  hours.

This peak is located on the El Yunque massif which also contains other smaller peaks such as Mount Britton, Juan Diego Peak and the Roca del Yunque which is a rocky peak close to the summit of El Yunque. El Yunque massif itself is part of the Sierra de Luquillo. The highest point in the Sierra de Luquillo is El Toro (Spanish for the bull) located in the municipal boundary between Río Grande and Las Piedras, which lends its name to the El Toro Wilderness.

Climate
El Yunque is classified as having a tropical rainforest climate, Köppen climate type 'Af', along with surrounding areas, approximating a subtropical highland climate at the peak. The average temperature of the park is 70 °F, and seasonal variation virtually nonexistent. The rugged area can receive over 200 inches (5080 millimeters) of annual rainfall and is the rainiest of all US national forests.

Gallery

See also

El Yunque National Forest

References

External links

Mountains of the Caribbean
Mountains of Puerto Rico
Río Grande, Puerto Rico

Sacred mountains
Protected areas of Puerto Rico
American folklore